The Isotta Fraschini D80 (civilian version) is a large truck built in Italy from 1934 to 1955, the Isotta Fraschini D80 NM (military version) was built only in 1935.

History 
In the 1930s the Italian company Isotta Fraschini (IF), which specialized in the production of luxury cars, airplane, and naval engines had acquired through German company MAN SE the production license of Diesel engines. In 1934 they got in the truck market with the D80 heavy truck. In 1935 they added the D80 NM ("Nafta Militare" i.e. Army Diesel fuel), immediately adopted by the Italian Royal Army. They were also used by the Italian Corpo Truppe Volontarie in the Spanish Civil War. In 1937 the Isotta Fraschini D65 was added. These two trucks are known as the 1st series.

Following the unification decree of 1937, which required manufacturer to standardize certain properties (weight, capacity, number of axle, speed) in relation to any requisition for the war effort, in 1939 the Milanese house changed the rules thus allowing unified production of Isotta Fraschini D80 CO (civilian version) and D80 COM (military version) both known as the  2nd series.

After World War II, the 3rd series went into production for the civilian market. In 1949, Brazil Fàbrica Nacional de Motores (FNM) bought the rights for the production of the truck, and produced it there as the 'FNM R-80', then as 'FNM D 7.300'

Technical information 
The D80 is a heavy truck with, 4 × 2, with twin rear wheels. The cab, built by Zagato, is conventional, right-hand drive. On the nose, 5 chrome lines start from the badge in the center of the grille and move back along the sides of the bonnet. The engine is an I6 four-stroke Diesel  with displacement of 7,300 cc and delivers 95 hp 1900 rpm. The frame, supporting a 6.5 tons box has a 4.10 m wheelbase and an axle track of 1.78 m (front) and 1.77 (back). The D80 CO and COM of the "2nd series", "unified" in accordance with the provisions of the Government, are characterized by a low fuel consumption and the presence of booster air. Outwardly, the CO and COM civilian and military have the same cabin with rounded corners, but they differ in the nose: the civilian model has an oval-shaped grille, while in the military is rectangular in addition, while the civilian model is equipped with electric starter, the military was produced with a manual crank starter, and only into the war did the military version get equipped with electric start with battery.

See also 
Isotta Fraschini (the company)
Isotta Fraschini D65

Bibliography 
 The Vehicles tactical and logistic of the Royal Italian Army until 1943, vol. II (Italian), the Army, Historical Office, Nicola and Philip Pignato Chaplain, 2005.

References

External links 
card and photos on centoventesimo.it
card and photos on Italie 1935–1945.

D
FNM vehicles
Trucks of Italy
Vehicles introduced in 1935
Military trucks of Italy